Lance Barber (born June 29, 1973) is an American actor. He is best known for playing George Cooper, Sr. on the CBS sitcom Young Sheldon (2017–present), as well as Bill Ponderosa on the FX show It's Always Sunny in Philadelphia.

Early life
Barber was born and raised in Battle Creek, Michigan and developed an interest in acting at the age of seven, after seeing a performance of Grease at the Barn Theatre. He acted at Pennfield High School, from which he graduated in 1991, and performed in school productions from Kellogg Community College while earning his associate degree.

Career
After a year at the Barn Theatre, alongside Jennifer Garner, Barber moved to Chicago and spent five years working his way up in The Second City improvisational comedy troupe. He then moved to Los Angeles and had his first television role in On the Spot, an improv sketch show that ran for five episodes on The WB in 2003. He credits his breakthrough to the 2005 HBO series The Comeback with Lisa Kudrow, in which he played Paulie G., a television writer.   In 2010, he landed the recurring role of Bill Ponderosa on FX's It's Always Sunny in Philadelphia. He reprised his role as Paulie G. when HBO brought back The Comeback in 2014. He also starred in episodes of How I Met Your Mother, Gilmore Girls, Californication, Monk, The Mentalist, and Grey's Anatomy.

Barber played Jimmy Speckerman, who bullied Leonard Hofstadter at high school, in one episode of The Big Bang Theory. He was cast as George Cooper Sr., father of Sheldon Cooper, in the spin-off Young Sheldon that premiered in 2017, and mentioned in an interview that some fans were confused by his different roles in the two related series. Barber also played Cooper in "The VCR Illumination", a 2018 episode of the parent show's twelfth season; the character is deceased in the series but appears on a video tape that Sheldon unexpectedly watches.

Personal life
Barber lives in Los Angeles with his wife Aliza, who is a chef, and their two young children.

Filmography

Film 
Acting roles in film productions:

Television 
Roles and voice acting work in television films and series:

References

External links
 
Lance Barber on CBS.com

Living people
1973 births
21st-century American male actors
American male film actors
American male television actors
American male voice actors
Male actors from Michigan
People from Battle Creek, Michigan